Restoration of Ukraine is a parliamentary group in the Verkhovna Rada of Ukraine, founded on 22 May 2022. The co-chairs of the party are deputies Maxim Efimov and Igor Abramovych.

History

The parliamentary group was founded on 22 May  2022, this was announced by the People's Deputy Yaroslav Zheleznyak in his Telegram channel.

In August 2022, the parliamentary group had 18 deputies: most of them moved from the Opposition Platform — For Life, some also from the Servant of the People and Dovira. On 21 September 2022, former Servant of the People deputy Yevheniy Shevchenko joined the parliamentary group.

See also
Platform for Life and Peace

References

2022 establishments in Ukraine
Parliamentary factions in Ukraine
Political parties established in 2022